The Player of the Month is an association football award that recognises the best Kategoria Superiore player each month of the season. It is presented by association "Sporti Na Bashkon". This award was established in the 2010–11 season.

Winners

Multiple winners
The below table lists those who have won on more than one occasion.

Awards won by position

Awards won by nationality

Awards won by club

See also
List of Kategoria Superiore all-time goalscorers
List of Kategoria Superiore hat-tricks

References

External links
Albanian Football Federation

Association football player of the month awards
Kategoria Superiore